Alena Alekseyevna Trapeznikova (born 30 May 1987) is a Russian ski-orienteering competitor. She won a silver medal in the middle distance at the 2011 World Ski Orienteering Championships in Sweden, behind Polina Malchikova and ahead of Stine Olsen Kirkevik.

External links

References

1987 births
Living people
People from Komsomolsk-on-Amur
Russian orienteers
Female orienteers
Ski-orienteers
Sportspeople from Khabarovsk Krai